PP-148 Lahore-V is a Constituency of Provincial Assembly of Punjab.

General elections 2018

See also
 PP-147 Lahore-IV
 PP-149 Lahore-VI

References

External links
 Election commission Pakistan's official website
 Awazoday.com check result
 Official Website of Government of Punjab

Provincial constituencies of Punjab, Pakistan